Zapisovatelé otcovský lásky is a Czech novel, written by Michal Viewegh. It was first published in 1998.

References 

1998 Czech novels